Libčeves is a municipality and village in Louny District in the Ústí nad Labem Region of the Czech Republic. It has about 900 inhabitants.

Administrative parts
Villages of Charvatce, Hnojnice, Hořenec, Jablonec, Lahovice, Mnichov, Řisuty, Sinutec, Všechlapy and Židovice are administrative parts of Libčeves.

Notable people
Franz Gregor Ignaz Eckstein (c. 1689–1741), Austrian painter

References

Villages in Louny District